Ahmadabad Deris (also Romanized as Aḩmadābād Derīs; also known as Aḩmadābād) is a village in Deris Rural District, in the Central District of Kazerun County, Fars Province, Iran. At the 2006 census, its population was 391, in 90 families.

References 

Populated places in Kazerun County